Marielle Thompson (born June 15, 1992) is a Canadian freestyle skier specializing in ski cross.  She is the 2014 Winter Olympic and 2019 World champion in women's ski cross, as well as a three-time FIS World Cup Crystal Globe winner as the top-ranked athlete in that discipline (for the 2011–2012, 2013–2014, and 2016–17 seasons) and the 2013 Junior World champion.

Career
She debuted in the World Cup on December 18, 2010. Thompson placed third on December 17, 2011 in San Candido, Italy. In the 2010–11 World Cup season she placed 50th in Overall Freestyle standings and at 17th place in ski cross standings. Thompson was again a strong contender during the 2013–14 season going into the Winter Olympics, leading the way in the standings again. At the end of the 2014 season, she won the World Cup Overall title in an exciting finish in La Plagne, France. Marielle is still the only Canadian to win a Crystal Globe, and now she has received the prestigious award twice.

At the 2014 Winter Olympics, Thompson qualified third, going into the elimination rounds for ski cross. Her teammate and compatriot, Kelsey Serwa, qualified in first place just ahead of Ophelie David of France. Thompson made her way into the finals, where Serwa also made the final in a near photo finish. In the big final, Thompson led nearly the entire way, and Serwa trailed just behind after a fall by David. The Canadians would end the race in the one and two positions, securing gold and silver. After the race, Thompson said that "It's crazy. I don't think it's even sunk in yet. I just had a big wave of emotion. I'm so, so happy, especially to be up there with my teammate. We're just having fun all day. I know Kelsey, and we tried to help each other all the way down the course."

While training for the 2018 Winter Olympics in October 2017, Thompson crashed and ruptured her ACL and injured her MCL, putting her participation in the games in jeopardy.  However, she ultimately was able to participate in the Olympic ski cross event, having undergone an accelerated rehabilitation program.  Thompson placed first in the seeding runs on February 22.  She was eliminated in the first heat after falling and finishing third.  The event was instead won by teammate Serwa, with another teammate, Brittany Phelan, taking the silver medal.

Thompson finished third in the standings in the following two seasons on the World Cup circuit, and in 2019 won the women's ski cross title at the 2019 World Championships in Deer Valley.

On January 24, 2022, Thompson was named to Canada's 2022 Olympic team. Thompson would go onto win the silver medal in the women's ski cross event.

Personal life
She is the sister of alpine skier Broderick Thompson.

Results

Olympic results

World Championships results

World Cup results
All results are sourced from the International Ski Federation (FIS).

Season standings

Race Podiums
 25 wins – (25 SX)
 49 podiums – (49 SX)

References

External links
 
 
 
 
 
 

Canadian female freestyle skiers
1992 births
Living people
Medalists at the 2014 Winter Olympics
Medalists at the 2022 Winter Olympics
Olympic medalists in freestyle skiing
Olympic freestyle skiers of Canada
Olympic gold medalists for Canada
Olympic silver medalists for Canada
Freestyle skiers at the 2014 Winter Olympics
Freestyle skiers at the 2018 Winter Olympics
Freestyle skiers at the 2022 Winter Olympics
People from North Vancouver
Skiers from Vancouver
X Games athletes